A polyatomic ion (also known as a molecular ion) is a covalent bonded set of two or more atoms, or of a metal complex, that can be considered to behave as a single unit and that has a net charge that is not zero. The term molecule may or may not be used to refer to a polyatomic ion, depending on the definition used. The prefix poly- carries  the meaning "many" in Greek, but even ions of two atoms are commonly described as polyatomic.

In older literature, a polyatomic ion may instead be referred to as a radical (or less commonly, as a radical group). In contemporary usage, the term radical refers to various free radicals, which are species that have an unpaired electron and need not be charged.

Polyatomic ions often are useful in the context of acid–base chemistry and in the formation of salts.

Often, a polyatomic ion can be considered as the conjugate acid or base of a neutral molecule. For example, the conjugate base of sulfuric acid (H2SO4) is the polyatomic hydrogen sulfate anion. The removal of another hydrogen ion produces the sulfate anion.

Nomenclature of polyatomic anions
There are two "rules" that can be used for learning the nomenclature of polyatomic anions. First, when the prefix bi is added to a name, a hydrogen is added to the ion's formula and its charge is increased by 1, the latter being a consequence of the hydrogen ion's +1 charge.

Most of the common polyatomic anions are oxyanions, conjugate bases of oxyacids (acids derived from the oxides of non-metallic elements).

The second rule is based on the oxidation state of the central atom in the ion, which in practice is often (but not always) directly related to the number of oxygen atoms in the ion, following the pattern shown below. The following table shows the chlorine oxyanion family:

As the number of oxygen atoms bound to chlorine increases, the chlorine's oxidation number becomes more positive. This gives rise to the following common pattern: first, the -ate ion is considered to be the base name; adding a per- prefix adds an oxygen, while changing the -ate suffix to -ite will reduce the oxygens by one, and keeping the suffix -ite and adding the prefix hypo- reduces the number of oxygens by one more, all without changing the charge. The naming pattern follows within many different oxyanion series based on a standard root for that particular series. The -ite has one less oxygen than the -ate, but different -ate anions might have different numbers of oxygen atoms.

These rules do not work with all polyatomic anions, but they do apply to several of the more common ones. The following table shows how these prefixes are used for some of these common anion groups.

Other examples of common polyatomic ions
The following tables give additional examples of commonly encountered polyatomic ions. Only a few representatives are given, as the number of polyatomic ions encountered in practice is very large.

See also
Monatomic ion

References

External links
General Chemistry Online: Companion Notes: Compounds: Polyatomic ions
List of polyatomic ions
Tables of Common Polyatomic Ions, including PDB files

Ions